Massachusetts House of Representatives' 12th Suffolk district in the United States is one of 160 legislative districts included in the lower house of the Massachusetts General Court. It covers part of Milton in Norfolk County and part of Boston in Suffolk County. Democrat Dan Cullinane of Dorchester has represented the district since 2013. In 2020 Cullinane opted not to run for re-election. There are three candidates running in the 2020 Democratic primary: Stephanie Everett, Brandy Fluker-Oakley, and Jovan Lacet. The field formerly included Cam Charbonnier, who will appear on the primary ballot but dropped out of the race in July, endorsing Everett for the seat.

The current district geographic boundary overlaps with those of the Massachusetts Senate's Norfolk, Bristol and Plymouth district and 1st Suffolk district.

Representatives
 Thomas Leavitt, circa 1858 
 Benjamin Lewis, circa 1858-1859 
 Edward Young, circa 1858 
 Daniel Hall, circa 1859 
 Judah Sears, circa 1859 
 Denis J. Quinn, circa 1888 
 Philip Henry Quinn, circa 1888 
 Daniel J. Gillen, circa 1920 
 Florence Cook, 1943-1946
 Thomas Martin Joyce, circa 1920 
 Philip Aloysius Chapman, circa 1951 
 Thomas J. Hannon, 1955–1957
 Robert H. Quinn, 1957–1965
 John G. Kelleher, circa 1975 
 Thomas Finneran, 1995–2004
 Linda Dorcena Forry, 2005 - June 14, 2013
 Dan Cullinane, 2013-2020
 Brandy Fluker Oakley, 2021-present

See also
 List of Massachusetts House of Representatives elections
 Other Suffolk County districts of the Massachusetts House of Representatives: 1st, 2nd, 3rd, 4th, 5th, 6th, 7th, 8th, 9th, 10th, 11th, 13th, 14th, 15th, 16th, 17th, 18th, 19th
 List of Massachusetts General Courts
 List of former districts of the Massachusetts House of Representatives

Images

References

Further reading

External links
 Ballotpedia
  (State House district information based on U.S. Census Bureau's American Community Survey).
 League of Women Voters of Boston

House
Government of Suffolk County, Massachusetts
Government of Norfolk County, Massachusetts